"Are You Ready to Be Heartbroken?" is a song by Lloyd Cole and the Commotions from the 1984 album Rattlesnakes.

The song was covered by Sandie Shaw in 1986. Her version reached number 68 on the UK Singles Chart in June that year.

In 2006, Camera Obscura released an answer song called "Lloyd, I'm Ready to Be Heartbroken".

Charts

References

1984 songs
1986 singles
Sandie Shaw songs
Polydor Records singles
Song recordings produced by Clive Langer
Songs written by Lloyd Cole
Songs written by Neil Clark (musician)